The 2016 UCLA Bruins football team represented the University of California, Los Angeles in the 2016 NCAA Division I FBS football season. The Bruins were coached by fifth-year head coach Jim L. Mora and played its home games at the Rose Bowl in Pasadena, California. They were members of the South Division of the Pac-12 Conference. The Bruins finished the season 4–8, 2–7 in Pac-12 play to finish in a tie for fourth in the South Division, and were outscored by their opponents by a combined total of 334 to 303.

Pre-season
 April 23, 2016 – Spring Showcase, Drake Stadium – 11:30 am

Personnel

Coaching Staff

Roster

Schedule

Game summaries

at Texas A&M

Calling the game on CBS: Verne Lundquist, Gary Danielson and Allie LaForce.

UNLV

Pac-12 Networks: Ted Robinson, Yogi Roth and Cindy Brunson.

at BYU

Stanford

Arizona

at Arizona State

at Washington State

Utah

at Colorado

Oregon State

USC

at California

Rankings

Coaches
 Jim L. Mora, Head Coach
 Rip Scherer, Senior Associate head coach/Tight Ends
 Kennedy Polamalu, Offensive Coordinator/Quarterbacks
 Adrian Klemm, Associate head coach/Running game coordinator/Offensive Line
 Tom Bradley, Defensive coordinator
 Demetrice Martin, Assistant head coach/Passing Game, Defense/Secondary
 Scott White, Linebackers/Special teams
 Eric Yarber, Wide Receivers
 Angus McClure, Defensive Line/recruiting coordinator
 Marques Tuiasosopo, Quarterbacks Coach/Passing Game Coordinator
 Sal Alosi, Coordinator of Strength & Conditioning

Notes
  Nov. 28 – Offensive Coordinator/Quarterbacks coach Kennedy Polamalu's contract was not renewed

References

UCLA
UCLA Bruins football seasons
UCLA Bruins football